Polivanov system is a system of transliterating the Japanese language into Russian Cyrillic script, either to represent Japanese proper names or terms in Russian or as an aid to Japanese language learning in those languages. The system was developed by Yevgeny Polivanov in 1917.

In terms of spelling the system is a middle ground between Kunrei-shiki and Hepburn romanisations, matching the former everywhere except for morae hu and tu, which are spelled as in Hepburn (fu and tsu), moras starting with z (which are spelled with dz, as in archaic Hepburn, but following the consistency of Kunrei-shiki with Jun being spelled as Dzyun) and syllabic n, which is changed to m before b, p and m as in traditional Hepburn.

The following cyrillization system for Japanese is known as the Yevgeny Polivanov system. Note that it has its own spelling conventions and does not necessarily constitute a direct phonetic transcription of the pronunciation into the standard Russian usage of the Cyrillic alphabet.

Main table
Hiragana and Katakana to Polivanov cyrillization correspondence table, for single/modified kana.

Syllabic n (ん/ン) is spelled м (m) before b, p, m, and spelled нъ before ya, yu, yo.

Grammar particles は and へ are written ва and э. Syllable を is written either во or о depending on pronunciation.

Diphthongs
It is permitted to use й instead of и in Chinese diphthongs ai and ei (e.g. синдзитай, сэйнэн).

Geminate consonants
Consonants are geminated exactly as they are in romaji: e.g. -kk- > -кк-.

Long vowels
Long vowels may be marked by macron as in Hepburn, but since letter ё has a diacritical mark already it is permitted and much more common to mark long vowels by using a colon (e.g. сё:гун). The sequence ei may be written э:, эй or эи. In regular texts long vowels are usually unmarked.

Common errors and deviations
In English texts, Japanese names are written with the Hepburn system. Attempts may be made to transcribe these as if they were English, rather than following a dedicated Japanese Cyrillization scheme.

A common example of this is attempting to transcribe shi (Polivanov: си) as ши and ji (Polivanov: дзи) as джи. This is inadvisable for use in Russian, because ши is actually pronounced like шы in Russian, and джи like джы, thus making the vowel closer to Japanese  than to Japanese . Whereas, щи would have a correct vowel sound, but be pronounced more like Japanese .

Equally often, people transcribe cha, chi, chu, cho as ча, чи, чу, чо. This is phonetically correct, but does not conform with the Polivanov scheme (тя, ти, тю, тё), which more closely resembles the Kunrei-shiki romanisations (tya, ti, tyu, tyo) for these particular characters.

Sometimes е, rather than э, is used for e, despite е being pronounced ye in Russian (though not in other languages). This is typically not done in the initial position, despite older romanisations such as "Yedo" doing so. In any case, it does not conform with the Polivanov scheme, although it is seen as more acceptable for words that are in general use (e.g. kamikaze > камикадзе instead of камикадзэ). Replacing ё (yo) with е (ye) is incorrect, however, as it will change the Japanese word too much.

The sound yo (Polivanov: ё), when in the initial position or after a vowel, is often written as йо (yo), which has the same pronunciation: Ёкосука -> Йокосука (Yokosuka), Тоёта -> Тойота (Toyota). Although, the spelling "йо" is not common in Russian words, these are more generally accepted for Japanese names than the transliterations using "ё". "Ё" is not often used in Japanese Cyrillization due to its facultative use in the Russian language (and possible substitution with the letter "Е" which would affect the pronunciation), but for professional translators, the use of ё is mandatory. Some personal names beginning with "Yo" (or used after a vowel) are written using "Ё" (e.g. Йоко for Yoko Ono, but Ёко for Yoko Kanno and all other Yokos).

Exceptions 
Some proper names, for historical reasons, do not follow the above rules.  Those include but are not limited to:

See also 
 Japanese language education in Russia
 Romanization of Japanese
 Cyrillization of Japanese

External links 
 Online Japanese→Polivanov transcription converter
 Proposal for a coordinated Japanese transcription system for several Slavic languages
 Automatic cyrillization of hiragana and katakana
 Kiriji and Yevgeny Polivanov

Japanese
Japanese writing system
Japan–Russia relations
Japan–Soviet Union relations